Mordred is an American funk metal/thrash metal band based in the San Francisco Bay Area. In their initial career, they released three studio albums and one EP from 1989 to 1994. The album Fool's Game (1989) meets the Bay Area thrash spirit, while The Next Room is more akin a Faith No More album.

In a 2016 interview on music website No Echo, bassist Art Liboon spoke about the lack of success after The Next Room was released:

After their first breakup in 1995, Mordred announced a reunion in 2001. In the following year, they played live in their hometown of San Francisco and went on to perform again. Despite this, no new material from the band was released until 2015. On October 20, 2013, Mordred created their official Facebook page, and a few days later, they announced a reunion with the "In This Life" lineup.

The band toured the UK and Ireland in 2014 with Jeff Gomes on drums alongside British Metal Revival band Kaine. They also played the new song "The Baroness" and announced their intention to record a new album.

Mordred's first full-length studio album in 27 years, The Dark Parade, was released on July 23, 2021.

Members

Current members 
 Art Liboon - bass, backing vocals (1984-1995, 2001, 2007, 2013-present)
 James Sanguinetti - lead guitar, backing vocals (1984-1986, 1990-1995, 2001, 2007, 2013–present)
 Aaron Vaughn - keyboards, turntables, backing vocals (1989-1995, 2001, 2007, 2013-present)
 Scott Holderby - lead vocals (1986-1993, 2001, 2013–present)
 Danny White - rhythm guitar (1986-1995, 2013–present)
 Jeff Gomes - drums (2014–present)

Former members
 Paul Kimball - lead vocals (1993-1994)
 Jim Taffer - lead guitar (1987-1989)
 Steve Scates - lead vocals (1984-1986, 2007)
 Eric Lannon - drums (1984-1987, 2001-2007)
 Alex Gerould - rhythm guitar (1984-1987)
 Slade Anderson - drums (1984-1985)
 Shawn Tearle - rhythm guitar (1986-1988)
 Sven Soderlund - rhythm guitar (1984-1985,2007)
 Chris Powell - rhythm guitar (2001)
 Gannon Hall - drums (1987-1995, 2001, 2013–2014)

Touring members
 Jeff Gomes (2013-2014)

Timeline

Discography

Studio albums
Fool's Game (1989)
In This Life (1991)
The Next Room (1994)
The Dark Parade (2021)

EPs
Falling Away (1991)
Vision (1992)
Volition (2020)

Home videos
In This Live Video (1992)

References

External links
 Mordred official website
 Mordred's Metal Archive Page
 BNR Metal Pages
 VH1 Page for Mordred
 Review for The Fool's Game
 
 

American funk metal musical groups
Musical groups established in 1984
Musical groups disestablished in 1995
Thrash metal musical groups from California
Noise Records artists